Slănic is one of the 12 towns of Prahova County, Muntenia, Romania, historically and currently known as a salt extraction center, as well as a spa town, with salt lakes. Two villages, Groșani and Prăjani, are administered by the town.

Etymology 

As its name (salt in Slavonic) suggests, most of Slănic's history and economy are directly related to the presence of relatively large quantities of salt underground, and even in open air.

Slănic is also the name of the creek flowing through the town, tributary of Vărbilău River, which in turn is a tributary of Teleajen River.

Although technically incorrect, the compounded name Slănic Prahova is also being used, especially in other parts of Romania. This alternative name was probably generated to help discern between Slănic and another Romanian town, Slănic-Moldova.

Natives
 Mihai Iliescu
 Bujorel Mocanu

Climate
Slănic has a humid continental climate (Cfb in the Köppen climate classification).

Tourism 

The town is famous for its salt lakes (or Băi): The Shepherd’s (Baia Baciului), The Green (Baia Verde) and The Red (Baia Roșie) Lakes, as well as for the Old (Salina Veche) and New (Salina Nouă) Salt Mines.  While salt is still being extracted from the New Salt Mine, the Old Mine is open to the public now, being used as a spa, amusement center and museum of the salt mining industry. International contests of Indoor Model Aircraft Flying (Modellism) take place annually in the upper level (Mina Mihai) of the Old Mine.

Other worthwhile tourist objectives, all within easy reach for any untrained hiker, are a local water spring named The Cold Fountain (Fântâna Rece), the TV Relay Tower (Releu) beyond The Fir Forest (Pădurea de Brazi), Beacon's Hill (Dealul cu Semn), The Salt Mountain (Muntele de Sare) with the legendary Bride's Cave (Grota Miresei), now partially collapsed due to rain erosion, as well as The Green Rock (Piatra Verde) and The Colt's Small Hill (Delușorul Mânzului).

References

External links 

  Memoirs de la Mine by Sabina Ispas. (Map of region, pictures, brief history of the town)
 Tourism Slanic Prahova (Great pictures taken underground, in the Old Salt Mine)
 History of Jewish communities worldwide. (Brief description of the town, some historic data)
 Totul despre Slanic (Pictures and some information on town's history/economy/tourism - text in Romanian) 
 Romanian Modellism Federation (Results of the 2006 Edition of the World Championship of Indoor Aircraft, Slanic, Romania)
 International Aeronautic Federation (Program of the 2006 Edition of the World Championship of Indoor Aircraft - Slanic, Romania)

Towns in Romania
Mining communities in Romania
Populated places in Prahova County
Localities in Muntenia
Spa towns in Romania